Alfred George Taylor (29 December 1891 – date of death unknown) was an English cricketer.  Taylor's batting and bowling styles are unknown.  He was born at West Ham, Essex.

Taylor made his first-class debut for Essex against Derbyshire in the 1923 County Championship.  He scored 7 runs in Essex's first-innings, before being dismissed by Arthur Morton, while in Derbyshire's first-innings he took Morton's wicket for the cost of 40 runs from 11 overs.  Days after this match he played his second and final first-class match against Surrey,  He scored no further runs or took any wickets in the match.

His date of death is not known.

References

External links
Alf Taylor at ESPNcricinfo
Alf Taylor at CricketArchive

1891 births
People from West Ham
English cricketers
Essex cricketers
Year of death missing